Nocturne is a Swedish love song and lullaby which was 
composed in 1948  by Evert Taube. The song is also called "Sov på min arm", from the first line of the lyrics.
The song was  first performed in the film "Sjösalavår" in 1949. The song
was first recorded by the composer's son, Sven-Bertil Taube, in 1954 and has been
covered many times since.

External links
Nocturne  Lyrics  at genius.com
Nocturne sung by Sissel Kyrkjebø at Taube Concert in 1986 (Youtube)

References 

Songs written by Evert Taube
Swedish songs
Sissel Kyrkjebø songs